Sir Thomas Stanley, 4th Baronet (27 September 1670 – 7 May 1714) was a British Member of Parliament.

Stanley was the son of Sir Edward Stanley, 3rd Baronet, and Elizabeth Bosvile, and succeeded his father in the baronetcy at the age of one. This branch of the Stanley family, known as the "Stanleys of Bickerstaffe", were descended from Sir James Stanley, younger brother of Thomas Stanley, 2nd Earl of Derby. Stanley later represented Preston in the House of Commons from 1695 to 1698. He married Elizabeth Patten in 1688, and died in May 1714, aged 43. He was succeeded in the baronetcy by his eldest son Edward Stanley, who in 1736 succeeded a distant relative in the earldom of Derby.

Notes

References
Kidd, Charles, Williamson, David (editors). Debrett's Peerage and Baronetage (1990 edition). New York: St Martin's Press, 1990.

1670 births
1714 deaths
Baronets in the Baronetage of England
Thomas
English MPs 1695–1698